The Riviera di Rimini Challenger  is a professional tennis tournament played on outdoor red clay courts. It is currently part of the Association of Tennis Professionals (ATP) Challenger Tour. It is held annually at the Circolo Tennis Rimini in Rimini, Italy, since 2004.

Past finals

Singles

Doubles

External links
Official website
ITF Search

 
ATP Challenger Tour
Clay court tennis tournaments
Tennis tournaments in Italy